Ionuț Bogdan Zaina (born 25 January 1994) is a Romanian professional footballer who plays as a midfielder.

References

External links
 
 

1994 births
Living people
Footballers from Bucharest
Romanian footballers
Association football midfielders
Liga I players
Liga II players
FC Rapid București players
CS Pandurii Târgu Jiu players
ACS Viitorul Târgu Jiu players